The following is a list of clubs who have played in the Israeli Premier League at any time since its formation in 1999 to the current season. Israeli Premier League teams playing in the 2010–11 Israeli Premier League season are indicated in bold. Founding members of the Israeli Premier League are shown in italics. If the longest spell is the current spell, this is indicated in bold, and if the highest finish is that of the most recent season, this is also in bold.

A total of 26 teams have played in the Israeli Premier League.

All statistics here refer to time in the Israeli Premier League only, with the exception of 'Most recent finish' which refers to all levels of play, and 'Last promotion' which refers to the club's last promotion from the second tier of Israeli football.

Clubs
Israeli Premier League Clubs